Glenn Victor Sutanto (born 7 November 1989) is an Indonesian competition swimmer who competes in the Backstroke, freestyle and butterfly events. He competed in the 2016 Summer Olympics in the 100 metre butterfly category, where he ranked 35 in the heats.

References

Indonesian male swimmers
Swimmers at the 2016 Summer Olympics
Olympic swimmers of Indonesia
1989 births
Living people
Indonesian people of Chinese descent
Swimmers at the 2010 Asian Games
Swimmers at the 2014 Asian Games
Swimmers at the 2018 Asian Games
Sportspeople from Bandung
Southeast Asian Games medalists in swimming
Southeast Asian Games gold medalists for Indonesia
Southeast Asian Games silver medalists for Indonesia
Southeast Asian Games bronze medalists for Indonesia
Competitors at the 2007 Southeast Asian Games
Competitors at the 2009 Southeast Asian Games
Competitors at the 2011 Southeast Asian Games
Competitors at the 2013 Southeast Asian Games
Competitors at the 2015 Southeast Asian Games
Competitors at the 2017 Southeast Asian Games
Asian Games competitors for Indonesia
Competitors at the 2019 Southeast Asian Games
Competitors at the 2021 Southeast Asian Games
21st-century Indonesian people